The Supreme Council of the Republic of Georgia (sakartvelos respublikis uzenaesi sabcho) was the highest unicameral legislative body in Georgia elected in the first democratic, multiparty elections in the Caucasus on October 28, 1990, while the country was still part of the Soviet Union. The Council presided over the declaration of Georgia's independence from the Soviet Union in April 1991. The legislature split into rivaling factions and became defunct after a violent coup d'état ousted President Zviad Gamsakhurdia in January 1992. A pro-Gamsakhurdia faction managed to convene for a few times in exile and again in Georgia during Gamsakhurdia's failed attempt to regain power later in 1993. The Supreme Council was succeeded – after a brief parliamentary vacuum filled by the rule of the post-coup Military Council and then the State Council – by the Parliament of Georgia elected in October 1992.

The Supreme Council of the Republic of Georgia was preceded by the Supreme Soviet of the Georgian Soviet Socialist Republic (July 1938–November 1990), which in its turn was a successor of the Congress of Soviets of Georgia (February 1922–July 1938).

The Chairmen of the Presidium of the Supreme Soviet were nominal heads of the republic and the Chairmen of the Supreme Soviet were the presiding officers of the legislature. Zviad Gamsakhurdia was both acting head of the republic and presiding officer of the legislature as the Chairman of the Supreme Council.

Chairmen of the Supreme Council of the Republic of Georgia

Sources
World Statesmen.org

Political history of Georgia (country)
Defunct unicameral legislatures
1990 establishments in Georgia (country)
1992 disestablishments in Georgia (country)